Van Mierevelt is a Dutch surname. Notable people with the surname include:

 Michiel Jansz. van Mierevelt (1566–1641), Dutch painter and draftsman
 Pieter van Mierevelt (1596–1623), Dutch painter

Dutch-language surnames